Hugh Doherty may refer to:

Hugh Doherty (footballer) (1921–2014), Irish footballer (Celtic FC, Blackpool, Derry City F.C)
Hugh Doherty (Irish politician) (1903–1972), Irish Fianna Fáil politician
Hugh Doherty (Irish republican), Irish republican and former Provisional IRA volunteer
Hugh Doherty (pentathlete) (1940–2006), Australian Olympic modern pentathlete

See also
Laurence Doherty (Hugh Laurence Doherty, 1875–1919), tennis player
Hugh O'Doherty (died 1924), Irish nationalist politician